Gustav Bläser (9 May 1813 – 20 April 1874) was a German sculptor.

Biography
He was born in Düsseldorf, and in 1833 entered the studio of Christian Daniel Rauch, with whom he remained for eleven years. In 1845 he went to Rome, whence he was called to Berlin to design one of the eight marble groups adorning the Schlossbrücke, a task in which he was eminently successful. The group executed by him, and entitled “Minerva Leading a Youthful Warrior into Battle,” is considered the best of the series. His subsequent works include: “Saint Matthew, the Apostle,” a statue of colossal proportions (church at Helsingfors); “The Prophet Daniel” (Royal Castle, Berlin); “Borussia” (New Museum, Berlin); the equestrian statue of Frederick William IV (Rhine Bridge, Cologne); “Hospitality” (National Gallery, Berlin); and busts of Emperor William I, the Empress of Russia, von Alvensleben, von der Heydt, Alexander von Humboldt, Rauch, Abraham Lincoln (Washington, D.C.), and many others.

References

 
 
 
 Andreas W. Daum, "Nation, Naturforschung und Monument: Humboldt-Denkmäler in Deutschland und den USA"  [Humboldt monuments in Germany and the US]. Die Kunst der Geschichte: Historiographie, Ästhetik, Erzählung, ed. Martin Baumeister et al. Göttingen: Vandenhoeck & Ruprecht, 2009, 99‒124.

External links
 

1813 births
1874 deaths
19th-century German sculptors
German male sculptors
Artists from Düsseldorf